Arthur Rubinstein – The Love of Life is a 1969 documentary about Polish-American pianist Arthur Rubinstein.

The film won the 1969 Academy Award for Best Documentary Feature. It was also screened at the 1969 Cannes Film Festival, but outside the main competition.

References

External links
 

1969 films
French documentary films
1960s French-language films
Best Documentary Feature Academy Award winners
Films directed by François Reichenbach
Documentary films about classical music and musicians
1969 documentary films
Films about pianos and pianists
1960s French films